Sidharth Sharma (23 October 1994 – 12 January 2023) was an Indian cricketer. He made his first-class debut for Himachal Pradesh in the 2017–18 Ranji Trophy on 1 November 2017. He made his List A debut on 21 December 2021, for Himachal Pradesh in the 2021–22 Vijay Hazare Trophy.

Sharma died after a brief illness in Vadodara, Gujarat on 12 January 2023, at the age of 28.

References

External links
 

1994 births
2023 deaths
Himachal Pradesh cricketers
Indian cricketers